Worldly Goods is a 1924 American silent comedy film directed by Paul Bern and written by Sophie Kerr and A. P. Younger. The film stars Agnes Ayres, Patrick H. O'Malley, Jr., Victor Varconi, Edythe Chapman, Bert Woodruff, Maude George, and Cecille Evans. The film was released on November 24, 1924, by Paramount Pictures.

Plot
As described in a review in a film magazine, Eleanor Lawson (Ayres) chooses to marry Fred Hopper (O'Malley), a breezy salesman, instead of Clifford Ramsay, the young and wealthy head of a big department store. The honeymoon is hardly over when bill collectors besiege Hopper and his wife learns that he is more talk than industry. They are in a bad way when Eleanor gets work and Hopper decides to ask Clifford Ramsay (Varconi) for a job. He overhears Ramsay discussing the purchase of a site, obtains an option on the property through the loan of money from an infatuated married woman, and cleans up $70,000. In the meantime, Eleanor has left him because of the other woman, but they are reconciled after Ramsay has failed to induce Eleanor to sue for a divorce.

Cast

Preservation
With no prints of Worldly Goods located in any film archives, it is a lost film.

References

External links

Stills at silenthollywood.com

1924 films
1920s English-language films
Silent American comedy films
1924 comedy films
Paramount Pictures films
American black-and-white films
American silent feature films
1920s American films